Megiel Burger Odendaal (born 15 April 1993 in Bloemfontein, South Africa) is a South African rugby union player. His regular position is inside centre.

Career

Youth and Varsity Cup rugby

Odendaal played his high school rugby for Monument High School in Krugersdorp, which led to his inclusion in  teams for youth week tournaments; he played for their Under-16 side at the 2009 Grant Khomo Week and for their Under-18 side at the 2011 Craven Week.

He played for the  side in the 2012 Under-19 Provincial Championship (scoring three tries in eight starts) and in the same year made the step up to Under-21 level, playing for the  side in the 2012 Under-21 Provincial Championship. He also played at that level in the 2013 Under-21 Provincial Championship.

Blue Bulls

He returned to the  side for their 2014 Vodacom Cup campaign. He made six appearances for them, all of them in the run-on side.

Lions 

Wasps Rugby 
On the 22nd February 2022, it was announced that he had signed for Wasps Rugby on their official website ahead of the 2022/23 season. He was made redundant along with every other Wasps player and coach when the team entered administration on 17 October 2022.

References

Alumni of Monument High School
South African rugby union players
Living people
1993 births
Rugby union players from Bloemfontein
Rugby union centres
Blue Bulls players
Bulls (rugby union) players
Kubota Spears Funabashi Tokyo Bay players
Lions (United Rugby Championship) players
Golden Lions players
Wasps RFC players
Toshiba Brave Lupus Tokyo players